Fengbo (Chinese: 風伯), also known as Fengshi, is the Taoist deity of the wind. In ancient times, he was depicted as a grotesque deity with the body of a deer, the head of a bird, horns, the tail of a snake, and patterns of a leopard. Eventually, Fengbo was replaced by Feng Po Po. According to the Records of the Grand Historian, he was an object of state ritual from early times, with temples and festivals held in honor of him.

Mythology of the Ming dynasty 
In the mythology of the Ming dynasty, Fengbo was also known as the Count of the Wind (Chinese: 風伯方天君, pinyin: Fēng bó fāng tiān jūn). He is depicted as an old man holding a fan, with a yellow cloak, a blue and red cap, and a white beard. He holds a goatskin bag of winds and directs them as he pleases. He is considered a stellar divinity, under the control of the star Ch’i of the Sagittarius constellation. In some myths, Fengbo lives in this constellation, where he looks after the solar breezes; when the moon passes too close to his star, he gets a little flustered, allowing too much wind to escape from his sack.

Fei Lien 
Fei Lien is considered the dragon form of Fengbo. There are two origin stories of Fe Lien.

Legends say that Fei Lien was originally one of the supporters of the rebel Ch’ih Yu, who was defeated by Huang Ti. He was transformed into a spiritual monster and stirred up tremendous winds in the southern regions. Emperor Yao sent Shên I and three hundred soldiers to quiet the storms and appease Ch’ih Yu's relatives, who were wreaking their vengeance on the people. Shên I ordered the people to spread a long cloth in front of their house and secure it to the ground with stones; this caused the wind to blow against it and change direction. Shên I then flew through the wind to the top of a high mountain and they saw a  monster, white and yellow in color breathing deeply. Shên I understood that the monster was the cause of all these storms and decided to shoot an arrow and try to kill it. The monster ran and hid in a deep cave. Shên I followed the monster which drew its sword and dared him to attack the Mother of Winds. Shên I bravely decided to face the monster and shot another arrow, this time hitting it in the knee. The monster was finally defeated.  It immediately dropped its sword and begged for its life.

Another legend says that Fei Lien appears as a dragon. He was initially one of the tyrant Chou's wicked ministers and could walk with unheard-of swiftness. Both he and his son Ô Lai, who was so strong that he could tear a tiger and rhinoceros to pieces with his bare hands, were killed while in service of Chou Wang. The legend says that Fei Lien had the body of a stag, about the size of a leopard, with a bird's head, horns, and a snake's tail, and was able to make the wind blow whenever he wished.

Relationships 
Some myths say that Fengbo is a subordinate of Chiyou and assists him in his struggle against the Yellow Emperor in the Battle of Zhuolu. He has been known to be friendly with the rain deity Yu Shi. Fengbo is considered a neutral god and does not belong to any faction. Fengbo, in his dragon form, is considered a troublemaker who needs to be watched by Shen Yi. In the Han Feizi (韓非子) or book of master Han Fei, when Huangdi the Yellow Emperor gathers all the demons at Mount Tai Fengbo sweeps the path.

See also
 Leigong

References

Chinese gods
Wind gods